Omorgus elevatus is a species of hide beetle in the subfamily Omorginae and subgenus Afromorgus.

References

elevatus
Beetles described in 1872